During the 20th century, the NCAA had no playoff for the major college football teams in the University Division, later known as Division I-A. 
The NCAA did recognize a national champion based upon the final results of "wire service" (AP and UPI) polls.  The extent of that recognition came in the form of acknowledgment in the annual NCAA Football Guide of the "unofficial" national champions.  The AP poll in 1961 consisted of the votes of 45 sportswriters, each of whom would give their opinion of the ten best teams.  Under a point system of 10 points for first place, 9 for second, etc., the "overall" ranking was determined.  Although the rankings were based on the collective opinion of the representative sportswriters, the teams that remained "unbeaten and untied" were generally ranked higher than those that had not.  A defeat, even against a strong opponent, tended to cause a team to drop in the rankings, and a team with two or more defeats was unlikely to remain in the Top 10. The top teams played on New Year's Day in the four major postseason bowl games: the Rose (near Los Angeles at Pasadena), Sugar (New Orleans), Orange (Miami) and Cotton (Dallas).

Conference and program changes

Progress of No. 1

September
In the preseason poll released on September 18, Iowa was No. 1, and its Big Ten rival Ohio State No. 2.  SEC teams Alabama and LSU were third and fifth, and Texas was fourth.  Rounding out the top ten were No. 6 Michigan State, No. 7 Penn State, No. 8 Kansas, No. 9 Mississippi, and No. 10 Syracuse.

As the regular season progressed, a new poll would be issued on the Monday following the weekend's games.  The Big Ten schools would not kick off until September 30.  On September 23, No. 3 Alabama won 32–6 at Georgia and No. 4 Texas won at California 28–3.  In Houston, No. 5 LSU fell to Rice 16–3.  No. 9 Mississippi, which had shut out Arkansas 16–0, and No. 10 Syracuse, which had beaten Oregon State 19–8 in Portland, rose into the top five.  In the poll that followed, Iowa remained No. 1, followed by No. 2 Mississippi, No. 3 Ohio State, No. 4 Alabama, and No. 5 Syracuse.  Texas dropped to sixth place.

September 30 California played a top-ranked team for the second straight week, losing at No. 1 Iowa 28–7.  No. 2 Mississippi won 20–6 at Kentucky.  Texas Christian University (TCU) tied No. 3 Ohio State 7–7 at Columbus.  In a game at Mobile, No. 4 Alabama beat Tulane 9–0.  No. 5 Syracuse defeated visiting West Virginia 29–14, but fell to seventh in the next ratings.  No. 6 Texas, which beat Texas Tech at home, 42–14, returned to the Top Five, along with previously unranked Georgia Tech, which shut out Rice 24–0. In the poll that followed, Iowa remained No. 1, followed by No. 2 Mississippi, No. 3  Georgia Tech, No. 4 Alabama, and No. 5 Texas.

October
October 7
No. 1 Iowa won 35–34 at USC. No. 2 Mississippi won 33–0 against Florida State. No. 3 Georgia Tech lost to LSU 10–0. No. 4 Alabama won 35–6 at Vanderbilt. No. 5 Texas routed Washington State 41–8. No. 6 Michigan State defeated Stanford 31–3. In the poll that followed, Mississippi took over first place from Iowa, which dropped to second.  These were followed by No. 3 Alabama, No. 4 Texas, and No. 5 Michigan State.

October 14 No. 1 Mississippi met the Houston Cougars at Memphis and won 47–7.  No. 2 Iowa beat Indiana 27–8 at home.  No. 3 Alabama beat North Carolina State 26–7 at Birmingham, and 
No. 4 Texas played its annual game against Oklahoma at Dallas, winning 28–7.  No. 5 Michigan State won at No. 6 Michigan, shutting out the Wolverines 28–0.  On the next poll, Michigan State took the No. 1 spot from Ole Miss by a margin of only two points (431 to 429), though the Rebels had more first place votes than the Spartans (21 vs. 16).  They were followed by No. 3 Texas, No. 4 Iowa, and No. 5 Alabama.

On October 21, No. 1 Michigan State got by No. 6 Notre Dame 17–7 at home, and No. 2 Mississippi shut out Tulane in a game at Jackson, 41–0.  No. 3 Texas won at No. 10 Arkansas, 33–7, No. 4 Iowa hosted Wisconsin, winning 47–15, and No. 5 Alabama defeated Tennessee at Birmingham, 34–3.  The top three (Michigan State, Ole Miss and Texas) were unchanged, while Alabama and Iowa traded places at 4th and 5th.

October 28 In a week of shutouts, No. 1 Michigan State beat Indiana 35–0, and No. 2 Mississippi had an even bigger blowout, 47–0, against Vanderbilt.  No. 3 Texas beat the visiting Rice Owls, 34–7, while No. 4 Alabama won at Houston over the Cougars, 17–0.  No. 5 Iowa was on the wrong side of a shutout, losing 9–0 at Purdue.  The top 4 stayed the same, while No. 6 Ohio State, which had won at Wisconsin 30–21, took fifth place from Iowa, whom they would play the following Saturday.

November
November 4  No. 1 Michigan State fell to unranked Minnesota, 13–0.  At the same time, No. 2 Mississippi lost to No. 6 LSU 10–7 at Baton Rouge.  The No. 3 Texas Longhorns beat the SMU Mustangs at Dallas, 27–0.  No. 4 Alabama shut out Mississippi State 24–0.  At Columbus, No. 5 Ohio State beat No. 9 Iowa 29–13. Texas, Alabama and Ohio State moved up to 1st, 2nd and 3rd, and giant-killers LSU and Minnesota were 4th and 5th.  Michigan State and Ole Miss fell to 6th and 7th.

November 11 No. 1 Texas beat Baylor, 33–7.  No. 2 Alabama crushed the visiting Richmond Spiders (which would be I-AA later) 66–0 at home.  No. 3 Ohio State won 16–7 at Indiana, No. 4 LSU won 30–0 at North Carolina, and No. 5 Minnesota handed Iowa its third straight loss, 16–9. The Hawkeyes, ranked first in the preseason poll, would finish just 5–4. No. 6 Michigan State, too, lost its second straight, falling 7–6 at Purdue.  The Top Five remained unchanged.

November 18 Texas Christian University had earlier tied Ohio State 6–6 in Columbus, and bested that with a win over No. 1 Texas in Austin, 6–0.  After his team's loss, legendary Texas coach Darrell Royal uttered his immortal description of TCU: "They're like a bunch of cockroaches. It's not what they eat and tote off, it's what they fall into and mess up that hurts."

No. 2 Alabama beat Georgia Tech in Birmingham, 10–0.  No. 3 Ohio State defeated visiting Oregon, 22–12, and No. 4 LSU hosted Mississippi State and won 14–6. No. 5 Minnesota defeated No. 7 Purdue, 10–7, at home.  Alabama (9–0) rose to No. 1, with Ohio State (7–0–1) at No. 2.  Minnesota (7–1) rose to No. 3, LSU (8–1) stayed at No. 4 and Texas (8–1) fell from No. 1 to No. 5.

Post-Thanksgiving (November 25) No. 1 Alabama was idle.  No. 2 Ohio State won at Michigan, 50–20.  No. 3 Minnesota narrowly lost to Wisconsin 23–21.  No. 4 LSU crushed visiting Tulane, 62–0. No. 5 Texas won 25–0 over Texas A&M, wrapping up the SWC title and a berth in the Cotton Bowl. Ole Miss, which was idle, returned to the Top Five: No. 1 Alabama, No. 2 Ohio State, No. 3 LSU, No. 4 Texas, and No. 5 Mississippi.

December 2, No. 1 Alabama won its annual Birmingham game against the Auburn Tigers, 34–0, to close the season with a 10–0–0 record, an SEC championship, and a berth in the Sugar Bowl against No. 9 Arkansas.  No. 5 Mississippi closed its season at 9–1–0 with a 37–7 win against Mississippi State and prepared to meet Texas in the Cotton Bowl. For the third year in a row, Ole Miss was undefeated and untied against all opponents other than LSU, which had beaten them in 1959 and 1961 and tied them in 1960. The Bayou Bengals would meet the Big 8 champion, No. 7 Colorado, in the Orange Bowl.

The AP's final poll was a Top 20 ranking.  With 26 of the 48 first place votes the Alabama Crimson Tide was awarded the AP Trophy, ahead of Ohio State (with 20 votes).  The point total was even closer, with 16 points separating the Tide from the Buckeyes (452 to 436). The final poll was: No. 1 Alabama, No. 2 Ohio State, No. 3 Texas, No. 4 LSU, No. 5 Mississippi, No. 6 Minnesota, No. 7 Colorado, No. 8 Michigan State, No. 9 Arkansas, No. 10 Utah State, No. 11 Missouri, No. 12 Purdue, No. 13 Georgia Tech, No. 14 Syracuse, No. 15 Rutgers, and No. 16 UCLA.  Arizona, Penn State and Rice were tied for 17th place, followed by No. 20 Duke.  Unbeaten and tied only once, Ohio State University qualified for the Rose Bowl.  In a move that stunned the sports world, however, the University's faculty council voted 28–25 on November 28 not to accept the invitation, declaring that the school's emphasis on sports over academics was excessive.  The wire service commented that "A team of 57 Ohio State University faculty members handed the second ranked Buckeyes their only defeat of the season.".  The University of Minnesota took the Buckeyes' place at Pasadena, where they would play UCLA.

Conference standings

Bowl games
Major bowlsMonday, January 1, 1962Other bowls

 Prior to the 1975 season, the Big Ten and AAWU (later Pac-8) conferences allowed only one postseason participant each, for the Rose Bowl.

Heisman Trophy votingThe Heisman Trophy is given to the year's most outstanding player''Source:'''

See also
 1961 NCAA University Division football rankings
 1961 College Football All-America Team

References